Saint-Louis-la-Chaussée station (French: Gare de Saint-Louis-la-Chaussée) is a railway station serving the community of Saint-Louis-la-Chaussée (Neuweg) in the north of the commune of Saint-Louis, Alsace, France. The station is served by regional trains to Mulhouse and Basel.

References

External links

Railway stations in Haut-Rhin